Donald 'Don' Wilfred Gale (20 February 1935 – 22 August 2002) was an Australian rules football player who played for Wynyard and Burnie in the NWFU and Hobart in the TFL. He was selected in regional and state representative teams.

Wynyard
Gale began his senior career with Wynyard in 1953, debuting against Penguin on 18 April 1953. He performed so well in his first season that he finished fourth in the club best and fairest award.

Unable to move to VFL
He was signed by South Melbourne at the end of the 1954 season, but over the next couple of years was unable to obtain a clearance.

Hobart and back to Wynyard
Gale played with Hobart in 1957, but then returned to Wynyard in 1958. At the Melbourne Centenary Carnival that year, Gale achieved All Australian selection, becoming the first player from the NWFU to do so.

Burnie
Don Gale was captain-coach of Burnie for the 1961 and 1962 seasons, leading his team to the premiership in the latter year. He then announced his retirement at the age of 27.

Family connections to football
His father, Jack Gale, played three games for the Richmond Football Club in the VFL in 1924 and his two sons, Michael Gale and Brendon Gale, had lengthy AFL careers throughout the 1990s.

References

External links
 
 https://afltashalloffame.com.au/inductees/69-don-gale/

Burnie Football Club players
Hobart Football Club players
Wynyard Football Club players
All-Australians (1953–1988)
Australian rules footballers from Tasmania
Tasmanian Football Hall of Fame inductees
1935 births
2002 deaths